Margaret Rogers or Maggie Rogers may refer to:

Margaret Rogers (nurse) (1875–1915), New Zealand WWI casualty
Margaret Rogers (politician) (born 1949), American state legislator in Mississippi
Maggie Rogers (born 1994), American performer
Maggie Rogers (White House maid) (1874–1953), American staff member

See also 
Margaret Rodgers (disambiguation)